This article lists the results for the China national football team between 1913 and 1949. Scores are listed with the Chinese score first, followed by the opponents' score.

1910s

1920s

1930s

1940s

External links
China national football team fixtures and results FIFA.com
Team China at sohu.com

1910s in China
1920s in China
1930s in China
1940s in China
1913–49